C.C. DeVille (born Bruce Anthony Johannesson; May 14, 1962) is an American guitarist best known as a member of rock band Poison. The band has sold more than 50 million albums worldwide, including 15 million in the United States.  In addition to DeVille's work with Poison, in 1998 he formed a band called Samantha 7.

DeVille has acted in both reality television and in scripted television drama shows. He starred in The Surreal Life season 6 and in The Surreal Life: Fame Games.

In 2015, VH1 ranked DeVille at number one in its list of most underrated hair-metal guitarists of the 1980s.

CC DeVille is a devout Christian.

Early years
DeVille was born Bruce Anthony Johannesson in the Bay Ridge area of Brooklyn, New York City, New York. DeVille began playing the guitar at the age of five after he was given a $27 Japanese Telecaster copy. As his love of music grew, he began listening to bands such as Led Zeppelin, Black Sabbath, the Rolling Stones, David Bowie, Aerosmith, Van Halen, The Who, Cheap Trick, New York Dolls, Queen, and especially Kiss.

At age 18 Deville auditioned and joined the local band Lace. The band adopted a highly sexual glam image inspired by New York Dolls and KISS.
DeVille also began studying music theory at New York University, but never completed his studies. Instead, he moved to Los Angeles in 1981 and played in various bands, including Screaming Mimi, Lace Slip, and St. James. DeVille also auditioned for the band Stryper before auditioning and being accepted into Poison.

Musical career
DeVille's audition impressed drummer Rikki Rockett and bassist Bobby Dall, but angered vocalist Bret Michaels. DeVille refused to play the songs that had been given to him as preparation, and instead jammed with a guitar riff he had written. The riff, which would eventually be featured in the Poison single "Talk Dirty to Me", would ultimately launch the band's career. Slash, who would go on to fame with Guns N' Roses, also auditioned for the position and made it to the final three, but lost to DeVille. In his autobiography Slash acknowledged discomfort with Poison's image when Rikki Rockett suggested that Slash wear make-up and change his clothing style.

DeVille co-wrote Poison's debut album with Bret Michaels, Bobby Dall, and Rikki Rockett. Look What the Cat Dragged In was released on August 2, 1986. It included the hits "Talk Dirty to Me", "I Want Action", and "I Won't Forget You". Sales for the album topped 3 million copies in the United States. DeVille also wrote much of the material for Poison's second album, the multi-platinum selling Open Up And Say... Ahh!, which was released on May 21, 1988 and would ultimately go on to sell 8 million copies worldwide. It included the hit song "Nothin' But a Good Time", co-written by DeVille, and Poison's only number 1 single "Every Rose Has Its Thorn".

In 1990, Poison released the multi-platinum selling Flesh & Blood, an album which was again largely written by DeVille.

Leaving Poison
While touring in support of Flesh and Blood, and despite Poison's success, substance abuse and tensions with other members of the band, particularly lead singer Bret Michaels, led to conflict within the band. Leading up to the release of the live album Swallow This Live conflict between Michaels and DeVille culminated in a fistfight backstage at the 1991 MTV Video Music Awards after DeVille played the wrong song, playing "Talk Dirty To Me" instead of "Unskinny Bop", and being high and intoxicated during the performance. Asked to quit, DeVille left Poison and was replaced by guitarist Richie Kotzen.

Following his departure from Poison, DeVille formed Needle Park, a band that also featured vocalist Spike of The Quireboys, bassist Tommy Henriksen, and drummer James Kottak (later of Scorpions), and recorded "Hey, Good Lookin'" for the soundtrack to the Pauly Shore movie Son in Law.

Samantha 7
Samantha 7 was a short-lived band composed of guitarist DeVille, guitarist Ty Longley, bassist Krys Baratto, and drummer Francis Ruiz. They played at Woodstock 1999. Originally the band's name was The Stepmothers, but the band was forced to change their name following a legal dispute with another band of the same name. DeVille can be heard referring to this band as The Stepmothers in a Behind the Music interview. Samantha 7 released the self-titled album Samantha 7 in 2000, and toured the US and UK in support of the record that was released on Columbia/Portrait Records.

The Samantha 7 song "I Wanna be Famous" would later be used in the opening of the reality show The Surreal Life: Fame Games, in which DeVille starred.

Return to Poison
DeVille regained contact with his Poison bandmates in 1996 for their Greatest Hits reunion tour in 1999. Several shows were recorded and released as a hybrid studio & live album release in 2000 titled Power to the People. DeVille continues to record and perform with Poison. In 2022, the band completed The Stadium Tour, a 36 date tour with Def Leppard, Joan Jett and Motley Crue in football stadiums across the US which grossed $173.5 million in ticket sales.

Television
In 2005 and 2006, DeVille starred in a popular TV series South of Nowhere on The N. He played the role of Raife Davies, the father of Ashley Davies and Kyla Woods.
Also in 2006 when Poison celebrated their 20th anniversary, DeVille starred in The Surreal Life on VH1. He also starred in the spin-off series The Surreal Life: Fame Games in 2007.  In 2002, DeVille had a brief cameo appearance as "Lloyd", a member of the airband GFK Groovecart, on the last episode of season 6 of Just Shoot Me! (titled "The Boys In The Band").

Family
In March 2007, DeVille and his girlfriend Shannon Malone became parents with the birth of Vallon Deville Johannesson.

Vallon is also a musician, and plays drums with The Finz, an American rock band local to Southern California.  The Finz are the youngest band to ever play the House of Blues, Anaheim.

Parodies
In 2001, DeVille became the inspiration for rock & roll comic C.C. Banana. A twisted homage to DeVille, C.C. Banana speaks in a cartoonish parody of DeVille's voice and wears a large yellow banana costume. C.C. Banana has interviewed numerous rock stars and made many TV appearances.

Parody act Beatallica mentioned DeVille in the song "I want to choke your band", the theme of which pits heavy metal bands against glam metal like Warrant, Poison, and Whitesnake. The lyric goes "No mercy for C.C., 'cuz he's in a hair band".

Discography

Solo
 1993 - C.C. DeVille - Son in Law Soundtrack - Hey Good Lookin' (with Spike from the Quireboys)
 2000 - Samantha 7

With Poison / Bret Michaels
 1986 - Poison Look What the Cat Dragged In
 1988 - Poison - Open Up and Say... Ahh!
 1990 - Poison - Flesh & Blood
 1991 - Poison - Swallow This Live
 1998 - Bret Michaels - A Letter from Death Row - Party Rock Band
 2000 - Poison - Power to the People
 2002 - Poison - Hollyweird
 2003 - Poison - Best of Ballads & Blues
 2003 - Bret Michaels - Songs of Life - Party Rock Band
 2006 - Poison - The Best of Poison: 20 Years of Rock
 2007 - Poison - Poison'd! (cover album)
 2008 - Poison - Live, Raw & Uncut
 2011 - Poison - Double Dose: Ultimate Hits
Other
 1990 - Sam Kinison - Have You Seen Me Lately? - Wild Thing
 1990 - Sam Kinison - Leader of the Banned
 1999 - LEN - You Can't Stop the Bum Rush - Feelin' Alright
 2000 - The Muffs - Hamburger - (Guitar Solo on "Silly People")
 2004 - Spin The Bottle: An All-Star Tribute To Kiss - "I Stole Your Love"
 2006 - Motörhead - Kiss of Death (Guitar Solo on "God Was Never On Your Side")

References

External links
C.C. DeVille Interview
 Poison Official Site

1962 births
Musicians from Brooklyn
American rock guitarists
American male guitarists
Glam metal musicians
Lead guitarists
Living people
Poison (American band) members
Guitarists from New York (state)
20th-century American guitarists
20th-century American male musicians
People from Bay Ridge, Brooklyn